"Slabtown" is the fourth episode of the fifth season of the post-apocalyptic horror television series The Walking Dead, which aired on AMC on November 2, 2014. The episode was written by Matthew Negrete and Channing Powell, and directed by Michael E. Satrazemis, who is the series' director of photography. In the episode, Beth Greene (Emily Kinney) finds herself in an operational hospital in Atlanta after being abducted in the previous season. Beth discovers that the hospital is ruled by a brutally enforced system and slowly plans her escape. Emily Kinney and Melissa McBride are the only regulars to appear in this episode, though McBride only appears in the final scene, whereas Kinney appears throughout the episode.

Plot
Beth awakens in Grady Memorial Hospital and is greeted by two survivors, Lt. Dawn Lerner and Dr. Steven Edwards. Dawn explains that her officers found Beth unconscious on the side of a road, surrounded by "rotters", and they saved her life. Dawn tells Beth that as a rule of the hospital, she must repay them with labor, and Beth is assigned to Dr. Edwards as a nurse. They are called to tend to a new patient, Gavin Trevitt. Dr. Edwards immediately writes Gavin off as a lost cause, but Dawn insists Edwards try to save him. After Edwards is unsuccessful, Dawn becomes infuriated, and slaps Beth across the face, reopening her previous injuries.

Later, Beth and Dr. Edwards must treat a worker, Joan (Keisha Castle-Hughes), who was bitten while attempting to escape the hospital. Despite Joan's pleas to be allowed to die, Dawn orders Dr. Edwards to amputate Joan's arm to prevent the infection from spreading. Beth meets another hospital worker named Noah (Tyler James Williams), who warns her that Dawn and her officers are more sinister than they seem. They only take in patients weak enough to control, and no ward has ever repaid their debts and been allowed to leave the hospital. He confides that he intends to escape and return to his community in Richmond, Virginia. A recuperating Joan warns Beth that Dawn chooses not to control her officers, and keeps their loyalty and morale high by allowing them to have their way with the patients, implying they have raped her.

One of the officers at the hospital, Officer Gorman (Cullen Moss), begins sexually harassing Beth but is stopped by Dr. Edwards. Beth asks Dr. Edwards why he stays at the hospital. Dr. Edwards explains that, in the aftermath of the bombing of Atlanta, the officers and surviving staff took shelter in the hospital until they ran out of supplies and were forced to scavenge. He tells her that a deal was made to take in and heal the injured in return for their labor, and says that no matter how bad conditions in the hospital get, it's a better alternative to the outside.

Dr. Edwards tells Beth to give Gavin, who is in life support, a dose of Clozapine, an atypical antipsychotic, which kills him. An angry Dawn demands to know what happened, and Noah lies and takes the blame. Dawn has Noah beaten as a punishment. Dr. Edwards insists to Beth that he told her to give Gavin Clonazepam, a benzodiazepine, rather than Clozapine. Dawn warns Beth that she knew Noah was lying but was forced to make an example of him for the greater good. Dawn tells Beth that she isn't strong enough for the world as it is, but Beth insists she is.

The next day, Beth and Noah plan to escape the hospital via the elevator shaft to the basement. While retrieving a key from Dawn's office, Beth finds the body of Joan, who has committed suicide. Beth is caught by Gorman, who offers his silence in return for sex. Beth hits him in the head with a lollipop jar, leaving him to be eaten by a reanimated Joan. Beth and Noah climb down the elevator shaft, but Noah gets attacked by a walker a few floors down and then falls and injures his leg, attracting walkers. Whilst escaping, Beth shoots some walkers with the gun she got from Gorman. Noah escapes, but Beth is recaptured in the parking lot after officers arrive.

Dawn confronts Beth about the deaths of Joan and Gorman. Beth tells Dawn that the two deaths were the result of the hospital's corrupt regime and that nobody is coming to rescue them. Dawn strikes Beth in anger. Later, while Dr. Edwards treats her injuries, Beth reveals that she discovered Gavin was a doctor. Dr. Edwards admits he knew Gavin, and he arranged his death in an attempt to remain indispensable to Dawn, ensuring his own survival. Appalled, Beth later obtains a pair of scissors with the intention of killing Dr. Edwards, but she is stopped in her tracks when a gurney carrying an unconscious Carol is brought into the hospital.

Reception
Upon airing, the episode was watched by 14.518 million American viewers with an 18-49 rating of 7.6, an increase in viewership from the previous week which had 13.801 million viewers and an 18-49 rating of 7.0.

In the United Kingdom, the episode was viewed by 1.218 million viewers, making it the highest-rated broadcast that week. It also received 0.102 million timeshift viewers. In Australia, it received 0.090 million viewers, making it the highest-rated cable broadcast that day.

The episode received generally positive reviews from critics. Matt Fowler of IGN gave the episode a 7.7 out of 10, saying: "As someone who actually enjoyed The Governor's two-episode diversion last season (while still realizing it was the show course-correcting in order to lead back to a legit prison battle), and also as someone who likes Beth, "Slabtown" was a bit of a drag. Not fully. There was some good stuff here. But it definitely was a hard comedown after the cannibal saga. So much so that it had me wondering (almost) the entire time what this new group's sinister secret was. And the truth, when revealed, wasn't really all that dark or exciting considering what we've already seen on this season."

References

External links

"Slabtown" at AMC

2014 American television episodes
The Walking Dead (season 5) episodes